Ahmad Djan (born 10 February 1948, in Panjshir Province ) is an Afghan former wrestler who was national champion and competed in the 1964 Summer Olympics 1968 Summer Olympics and in the 1972 Summer Olympics.

References

External links
 

1948 births
Living people
Sportspeople from Kabul
Olympic wrestlers of Afghanistan
Wrestlers at the 1968 Summer Olympics
Wrestlers at the 1972 Summer Olympics
Afghan male sport wrestlers
Wrestlers at the 1974 Asian Games
Asian Games competitors for Afghanistan